New Life church is an Evangelical Pentecostal multi-site megachurch based in Longueuil, Quebec, Canada, affiliated with Association chrétienne pour la Francophonie. The senior pastor is Claude Houde.

History 
The church was founded in 1993 in Longueuil, Quebec, starting with 50 members and pastored by Claude Houde. In 1998, following a massive ice storm causing severe cold and power cuts for more than a month, the church housed 500 homeless people for three weeks. It is recognized by the mayor as a public utility. In 2001, it inaugurated its current building including a 2,400-seat auditorium, the largest in Canada's Francophonie. In 2003, the church left the Pentecostal Assemblies of Canada. In 2005, it founded the Institute of Theology for the Francophonie, near the premises of Nouvelle vie. In 2006, the church began to draw over 3,000 people per week. In 2007, the church founded the Association chrétienne pour la Francophonie (Christian Association for the Francophonie), a network of Pentecostal churches, member of World Assemblies of God Fellowship. In 2010, Impact, a music group, was formed in the youth department of the church. The group has performed various tours in Europe.  In 2011, Nouvelle Vie had 4,000 members. In 2022, it had opened 6 campuses in different cities.

Humanitarian programs 
The church founded Action Nouvelle Vie in 1993, a humanitarian organization who offers  regular food aid, clothing, education and reintegration assistance is available.the poor in 1993. The organization has its own board of directors and is therefore an independent body of the church. In 2015, the 2159, a youth center that aims to develop independence and prevent homelessness and delinquency, is open.

Iglesia Nueva vida
The New Life Church also has a Spanish-speaking group, Iglesia Nueva vida, which offers worship services in Spanish.

See also
List of the largest evangelical churches
List of the largest evangelical church auditoriums
Worship service (evangelicalism)

Bibliography 
 Sébastien Fath, Dieu XXL, la révolution des mégachurches, Éditions Autrement, France, 2008, p. 110, 132, 141–143, 171
 Philippe Le Page, Megachurch pentecôtiste en contexte québécois : la religion vécue à l'Église Nouvelle Vie de Longueuil, Master's thesis in religious studies, UQAM, 31, Canada, 2015

References

External links
 Official Website
Official Website of Iglesia Nueva vida

Evangelical megachurches in Canada
Churches in Quebec
Pentecostal churches in Canada
1993 establishments in Quebec
Churches completed in 2001
Buildings and structures in Longueuil
Pentecostal multisite churches
Assemblies of God churches
21st-century religious buildings and structures in Canada